The County of Upper Tyrone, was a historic county of Ireland located in the northwest of the country.  It was merged with Nether Tyrone to form County Tyrone.

History of County Tyrone
Former counties of Ireland